Virginia's 24th Senate district is one of 40 districts in the Senate of Virginia. It has been represented by Republican Emmett Hanger since 1996.

Geography
District 24 is based in the Shenandoah Valley, including all of Augusta County, Greene County, Madison County, the City of Staunton, and the City of Waynesboro, and parts of Culpeper County and Rockingham County.

Its western edge borders the state of West Virginia.

Recent election results

2019

2015

2011

Federal and statewide results in District 24

Historical results
All election results below took place prior to 2011 redistricting, and thus were under different district lines.

2007

2003

1999

1995

References

Virginia Senate districts
Augusta County, Virginia
Rockingham County, Virginia
Staunton, Virginia
Culpeper County, Virginia
Waynesboro, Virginia
Greene County, Virginia
Madison County, Virginia